Skuja is a Latvian surname, derived from the Latvian word for "needle". Individuals with the surname include:

 Edgars Skuja (born 1966), Latvian diplomat
 Heinrich Leonhards Skuja (1892–1972), Latvian botanist and algologist

See also 
Skujiņš
Skujiņa

Latvian-language surnames